Antônio Carlos Cunha Capocasali Júnior (born 7 March 1993), known as Antônio Carlos, is a Brazilian footballer who plays as a central defender for Orlando City in MLS.

Club career

Early years
Growing up in the Coelho Neto neighbourhood of northern Rio de Janeiro, Antônio Carlos began his youth career at Fluminense and won three youth Carioca titles before questions over his height meant he was released. In search of first team opportunities as a teenager, Carlos turned to non-league team Sendas, winning the Copa Rio in 2010.

Corinthians
In 2011, Carlos joined the youth setup at Corinthians initially on a loan deal before Corinthians bought 40% of his economic rights from Audax. He first appeared in a friendly against Osasco. Scoring twice in a 2–1 win over former-team Fluminense in the 2012 São Paulo Youth Cup final, he was promoted to the main squad a month later and made his professional debut on 10 March 2012, starting in a 1–1 home draw against Guarani for the Campeonato Paulista championship.

Antônio Carlos had subsequent loan spells with Série B teams Oeste and Avaí before being released at the end of 2014.

Tombense
Antônio Carlos signed as a free agent with Tombense, a Série C team owned by Eduardo Uram, one of the leading agents in Brazil. From Tombense, Carlos was loaned to multiple Série A teams, first back to Avaí and then Flamengo, Ponte Preta and Palmeiras.

Palmeiras
Antônio Carlos' one-year loan deal with Palmeiras in 2017 was initially extended by the club for the start of the 2018 season before they decided to permanently purchase 50% of his economic rights in July 2018, signed the defender until June 2023. Carlos made 22 appearances in Série A as Palmeiras won the title in 2018.

Loan to Orlando City
On 30 December 2019, Carlos joined MLS team Orlando City on loan ahead of the 2020 season. He made his debut for the team in the season opener on 29 February as the team kept clean sheet in a 0–0 draw against Real Salt Lake. He scored his first goal for the team on 3 October 2020 in a 3–1 win over New York Red Bulls.

Orlando City
On 1 December 2020, Carlos made the move to Orlando City permanent ahead of the 2021 season.

International career
In March 2012, Antônio Carlos was called up to the Brazil U20s to compete in the International Mediterranean Cup in Barcelona, Spain. In March 2013, he was again called up, this time to play in the 2013 South American Youth Football Championship in Argentina but was a last minute cut after the coaching staff decided to add Jordi Almeida, a third goalkeeper, to the squad instead.

Career statistics

Honours

Club
Sendas
Copa Rio: 2010

Corinthians
Copa São Paulo de Futebol Júnior: 2012

Palmeiras
Campeonato Brasileiro Série A: 2018

Orlando City
U.S. Open Cup: 2022

Individual
Campeonato Paulista Team of the year: 2018

References

External links

1993 births
Living people
Footballers from Rio de Janeiro (city)
Brazilian footballers
Association football central defenders
Campeonato Brasileiro Série A players
Campeonato Brasileiro Série B players
Sport Club Corinthians Paulista players
Oeste Futebol Clube players
Avaí FC players
CR Flamengo footballers
Associação Atlética Ponte Preta players
Sociedade Esportiva Palmeiras players
Orlando City SC players
Brazilian expatriate sportspeople in the United States
Major League Soccer players